Betaga Union is a Union Parishad under Fakirhat Upazila of Bagerhat District in the division of Khulna, Bangladesh. It has an area of 59.57 km2 (23.00 sq mi) and a population of 15,305.

Villages 
 Mascata-1
 Mascata-2
 Dhanapotha
 Chakuli
 Betaga-1
 Betaga-2
 Betaga-1
 Nicklepur
 Chaderdhon
 Talbari
 Shattala
 Kumarkhali
 Bighai
 Shattala Adarshagram
 Kumarkhali Gussogram

References

Unions of Fakirhat Upazila
Unions of Bagerhat District
Unions of Khulna Division